= E-Z-GO 200 =

E-Z-GO 200 may refer to:

- The E-Z-GO 200 (fall), a NASCAR Craftsman Truck Series race held at Atlanta Motor Speedway in October 2008
- The E-Z-GO 200 (spring), a NASCAR Camping World Truck Series race held at Atlanta Motor Speedway in March 2010
